Jörg Tscherner (born 14 August 1947) is a German modern pentathlete. He competed for East Germany at the 1968 Summer Olympics.

References

1947 births
Living people
People from Nordsachsen
German male modern pentathletes
Sportspeople from Saxony
Olympic modern pentathletes of East Germany
Modern pentathletes at the 1968 Summer Olympics